Methyl 2-acetamidoacrylate is the organic compound with the formula CH2=C(NHC(O)CH3)CO2CH3.  It is the methyl ester of an N-acetylacrylic acid, which in turn is a derivative of the unstable compound dehydroalanine. Acetylation of the amine in the latter compound prevents tautomerization. It is a white solid.

The compound can be prepared from methyl 2-acetamidopropionate (CH3CH(NHC(O)CH3)CO2CH3), i.e. the methyl ester of N-acetylalanine. Methyl 2-acetamidoacrylate undergoes Michael reactions, e.g. by thiolates.

References